UFO Interactive Games, based in City of Industry, California, is an American publisher of interactive video game content, developing on multiple platforms with a focus on original and mass-market gaming software. As an official third party licensee of Nintendo of America and Sony Computer Entertainment of America, UFO Interactive Games has published numerous titles for the PlayStation 3, Xbox 360, Nintendo DS, Wii, PlayStation 2 and PlayStation Portable consoles.

The company has published titles which are designed to appeal to hardcore gamers and the general public, such as Raiden IV and Balloon Pop, and has also launched a line of titles tailored for more casual gamers, children and families.

UFO Interactive Games also has long-standing relationships and affiliates with other developers in Asia and Europe.

Games Published by UFO Interactive Games

Sega Dreamcast
Industrial Spy: Operation Espionage
Seventh Cross: Evolution
PlayStation 3
Raiden IV: OverKill - PSN Digital
Mamorukun Curse!
Heavenly Guardian - PSN PS2 Classics
GunShip - PSN PS1 Classics
Xbox 360
Raiden IV
Way of the Samurai 3
Rock of the Dead
Scourge: Outbreak - XBLA
PlayStation 2
Heavenly Guardian
Raiden III
PlayStation Portable
Chameleon: To Dye For!
Dungeon Maker II: The Hidden War
Warriors of The Lost Empire
Elminage Original - PSN Digital
Nintendo 3DS
Samurai Sword Destiny (eShop)
Balloon Pop 2
Zombie Slayer Diox
Johnny Kung Fu
Nintendo DS
Chameleon: To Dye For!
 Chuck E. Cheese's Alien Defense Force
 Chuck E. Cheese's Arcade Room
 Chuck E. Cheese's Gameroom
 Chuck E. Cheese's Party Games
 Chuck E. Cheese's Playhouse
Devilish: Ball Bounder
Florist Shop
Heavy Armor Brigade
Interactive Storybook DS: Series 1
Interactive Storybook DS: Series 2
Interactive Storybook DS: Series 3
Kurupoto Cool Cool Stars
Monster Rancher DS
Monster Racers
Labyrinth
OMG 26 -- Our Mini Games
Professional Fisherman's Tour: Northern Hemisphere
Rain Drops
Reversal Challenge
Rock Blast
Smart Boy's Gameroom
Smart Boy's Toy Club
Smart Boy's Winter Wonderland
Smart Girl's Party Game
Smart Girl's Playhouse
Smart Girl's Playhouse 2
Smart Girl's Winter Wonderland
Smart Girl's Magical Book Club
Smart Kid's Party Fun Pack
Smart Kids Gameclub
Sudoku Mania
Underground Pool
Underwater Attack
Nintendo Wii
Anubis II
Army Rescue
Balloon Pop
 Chuck E. Cheese's Party Games
 Chuck E. Cheese's Sports Games
 Chuck E. Cheese's Super Collection
Domino Rally
GEON
Heavenly Guardian
Rock Blast
Saint
Spy Games: Elevator Mission
The Monkey King: The Legend Begins
Ultimate Shooting Collection
Microsoft Windows
Fast Beat Loop Racer GT
PlayStation 4
Bubsy: The Woolies Strike Back
Raiden V: Director's Cut
Nintendo Switch
Freddi Fish 3: The Case of the Stolen Conch Shell
Putt-Putt Travels Through Time
Pajama Sam 2: Thunder and Lightning Aren't so Frightening
Pajama Sam: No Need to Hide When It's Dark Outside
Putt-Putt Saves the Zoo
Spy Fox in "Dry Cereal"

Awards 
iParenting Media Award 2007
The National Parenting Center Seal of Approval Fall 2007
The National Parenting Center Seal of Approval Holiday 2007
Children's Technology Review Editor's Choice Award 2007
The National Parenting Center Seal of Approval 2008

References

External links 
UFO Interactive Games
UFO Family
IGN UFO Company Description
The Earth Times - First and Only Developmentally Appropriate Preschool Games
Mom Central Article Review
They Were Mesmerized! Article Review
Postcards From the Mothership Article Review

American companies established in 1999
Video game companies established in 1999
Video game companies of the United States
Video game publishers
Companies based in the City of Industry, California
1999 establishments in California